Marion Thénault (born April 9, 2000) is a Canadian freestyle skier, who competes in the aerials discipline. At the 2022 Winter Olympics, Thénault was a part of Canada's bronze medal winning Mixed team aerials.

Career
She was born in Sherbrooke, Quebec.

She competed at the 2021 World Championships, where she placed sixth in the women's aerials.

On January 24, 2022, Thénault was named to Canada's 2022 Olympic team.

World Cup results

Race podiums

References

External links
 

2000 births
Living people
Canadian female freestyle skiers
Sportspeople from Sherbrooke
Freestyle skiers at the 2022 Winter Olympics
Olympic freestyle skiers of Canada
Medalists at the 2022 Winter Olympics
Olympic bronze medalists for Canada
Olympic medalists in freestyle skiing